The Central Post Office of Casablanca is a post office on Boulevard de Paris and Hassan II Boulevard in Casablanca, Morocco. It was designed by Adrien Laforgue in an architectural style described as "" and was constructed from 1918 to 1920 under the French Protectorate.

History 

Architecture 
Albert Laprade described the building as "paradigmatic in every respect; it is clear, concise, and practical and will make any Frenchman turn green with envy."

References 

Buildings and structures in Casablanca
Post office buildings
Moorish Revival architecture